Labba (Al Labbah) is a desert town in the Al Wahat District in the Cyrenaica region of northeastern Libya. 

From 2001 to 2007 it was part of Ajdabiya District. From 1983 to 1987 it was part of Jalu District.

References 

Populated places in Al Wahat District
Cyrenaica